The 2011 World Modern Penthathlon Championship was held in Moscow, Russia from September 8 to September 14, 2011. The event was supposed to take place in Cairo but because of the 2011 Egyptian revolution it was moved to avoid any further political instability. The event includes pistol shooting, fencing, 200m swimming, show jumping and a 3 km run. For the first time laser pistols were used.

Medal summary

Men's events

Women's events

Mixed events

Medal table

References

"Moscow snaps up Modern Pentathlon hosting rights."

Modern pentathlon competitions in Russia
2011 in Russian sport
2011 in modern pentathlon
Sports competitions in Moscow
Modern pentathlon in Europe